Ellis Ormsbee Briggs (December 1, 1899 – February 21, 1976) was an American diplomat who served as Ambassador to seven countries over the course of his career.

Early life and family
Briggs was born in Massachusetts to James Briggs and Lucy Hill Briggs, and was educated at Dartmouth College, graduating in 1921. He married Lucy Barnard in 1928. They had two children; Lucy in 1930, and Everett (who also went on to a career as an American diplomat) in 1934.

Diplomatic career

Retirement and publications
President John F. Kennedy nominated Briggs for the post of U.S. Ambassador to Spain. However, due to illness, Briggs was not able to accept the post, and retired from the State Department in 1962.

Briggs was the author of several memoirs and other works, including:

Shots Heard Round the World: An Ambassador's Hunting Adventures on Four Continents, a memoir written in 1957, while still with the State Department
Farewell to Foggy Bottom: The Recollections of a Career Diplomat, another memoir, this one written in 1964, after his retirement
Anatomy of Diplomacy: The Origin and Execution of American Foreign Policy, a 1968 book on international affairs
Proud Servant: Memoirs of a Career Ambassador, another memoir, this one published posthumously in 1998

He died in 1976 in Gainesville, Georgia.

References

External links
 The Papers of Ellis O. Briggs at Dartmouth College Library

1899 births
1976 deaths
Dartmouth College alumni
Ambassadors of the United States to Brazil
Ambassadors of the United States to Czechoslovakia
Ambassadors of the United States to the Dominican Republic
Ambassadors of the United States to Greece
Ambassadors of the United States to Peru
Ambassadors of the United States to South Korea
Ambassadors of the United States to Uruguay
United States Career Ambassadors